CIF, c.i.f. or Cif may refer to:

Finance
 Climate Investment Funds, in international climate change agreements
 Community Infrastructure Fund (CIF), a method of UK government funding for transport infrastructure 
 Cost, Insurance and Freight, (c.i.f.) a historic trade term and International Commercial Term (Incoterm) indicating that a price includes cost, insurance and freight
 Código de identificación fiscal, a former Spanish tax identification number for legal entities; See Identity document

Organizations
 California Interscholastic Federation, the governing body for high school sports in California
CIF Central Section
CIF Central Coast Section
CIF Los Angeles City Section
CIF North Coast Section
CIF Northern Section
CIF Oakland Section
CIF Sac-Joaquin Section
CIF San Diego Section
CIF San Francisco Section
CIF Southern Section
 Canada India Foundation, a Canadian lobbying organization
 China International Fund, a Chinese company that funds large-scale national projects in developing countries

Science and technology
 Caltech Intermediate Form, geometry language for VLSI design, in which the primitives are coloured rectangles (similar to GDSII)
 Catch-in Focus, a function offered by SLR cameras to release the shutter automatically when the subject comes into focus
 Central Instrumentation Facility, a former building at the Kennedy Space Center that housed data processing machines
 CFTR inhibitory factor (Cif), a virulence factor secreted by Pseudomonas aeruginosa
 Common Intermediate Format, a video format common in video teleconferencing
 Crystallographic Information File, a standard text file format

Other uses
 Counter Insurgency Force, a Police tactical unit of West Bengal Police
 Cif, a brand of household cleaning products by Unilever
 Cif., the standard author abbreviation for Raffaele Ciferri
 Champions Indoor Football, a professional indoor American football league 
 Chifeng Yulong Airport (IATA code), China
 Coming into force, the process of legislation becoming effective
 Comment is free (Cif), online comment section of The Guardian newspaper

See also
 Common Internet File System (CIFS), in computer networking